The 1977–78 Illinois State Redbirds men's basketball team represented Illinois State University during the 1977–78 NCAA Division I men's basketball season. The Redbirds, led by third year head coach Gene Smithson, played their home games at Horton Field House and competed as an independent (not a member of a conference). They finished the season 24–4.

The Redbirds received an invitation to the 1978 National Invitation Tournament. They were beaten by Indiana State University in the first round.

Roster

Schedule

|-
!colspan=9 style=|Regular Season

|-
!colspan=9 style=|National Invitation {NIT} Tournament

References

Illinois State Redbirds men's basketball seasons
Illinois State
Illinois State